St. Clement's Church is a Christian place of worship located in the island of Rømø in Tønder, Denmark. It belongs to the Tønder Priory of the Church of Denmark. The church was dedicated to Saint Clement, the sailors' patron saint. The oldest part of the church was built sometime after 1250 and expanded four centuries later. Possibly in the latter half of the 15th century, the church tower was built in the Gothic style. The church was expanded in the 17th and 18th centuries. Interior decoration includes several votive ships.

Gallery

References

External links

 Rømø kirke - Sankt Clemens Kirke website
Sankt Clemens Kirke Danmarks Kirker 
Sankt Clemens Kirche Römö - Informationen auf deutsch
 

Rømø
Buildings and structures in Tønder Municipality
Churches in the Region of Southern Denmark
Lutheran churches converted from Roman Catholicism
Churches in the diocese of Ribe